Nelson Efamehule Agholor (born May 24, 1993) is an American football wide receiver who is a free agent. He played college football at USC and was selected by the Philadelphia Eagles in the first round of the 2015 NFL Draft. During his five seasons with the Eagles, he won a Super Bowl title in Super Bowl LII. Agholor also played one season with the Las Vegas Raiders before joining the Patriots.

Early years
Born in Lagos, Nigeria, Agholor moved to the United States when he was five years old. He attended Berkeley Preparatory School in Tampa, Florida where he played running back, wide receiver, and defensive back for the Berkeley Buccaneers. He was rated by Rivals.com as a five-star recruit and was ranked as the third best wide receiver in his class. He committed to the University of Southern California in January 2012 over Notre Dame, Oklahoma, Florida, Florida State, and Alabama.

College career

As a true freshman in 2012, Agholor played in all 13 games as a backup wide receiver and recorded 19 receptions for 340 yards and two touchdowns.

As a sophomore in 2013, he became a starter. Agholor started all 14 games, totaling 56 receptions, 918 yards, and six touchdowns as a receiver. Along with being the leading receiver, Agholor returned punts and kicks for the Trojans. He returned 18 punts for 343 yards and two touchdowns, and 10 kickoffs for 175 yards. Agholor was recognized as a second-team All-American by numerous sports outlets for his punt returning. Agholor returned as a starter his junior season in 2014. He led the team with 104 receptions for 1,313 yards and 12 touchdowns.

After his junior season, Agholor decided to forgo his senior season and entered the 2015 NFL Draft.

Statistics

Professional career

Philadelphia Eagles
Agholor was selected by the Philadelphia Eagles in the first round with the 20th overall pick of the 2015 NFL Draft. He signed a four-year contract on May 7, 2015, worth around $9.4 million with a signing bonus of $5.1 million.

2015
On December 13, 2015, Agholor scored his first NFL career touchdown, a 53-yard reception from quarterback Sam Bradford, in a matchup against the Buffalo Bills. During his rookie season in 2015, Agholor played 13 games with 283 receiving yards and a touchdown.

2016
During his second season in 2016, Agholor played 15 games with 365 receiving yards and two touchdowns.

2017

On March 13, 2017, it was reported that Agholor would switch from the #17, which he wore in his first two seasons, to the #13. He opted to give the #17 to newly acquired free agent wide receiver Alshon Jeffery.

During the 2017 season, Agholor found more success when he was switched to a slot receiver role. On September 10, 2017, in the season opening 30–17 victory over the Washington Redskins, Agholor had a 58-yard receiving touchdown from quarterback Carson Wentz in the first quarter. He finished the game with six receptions for 86 yards. On September 17, in a Week 2 27–20 loss to the Kansas City Chiefs, he recorded his second touchdown of the season late in the fourth quarter to cut into the Chiefs' lead. He would end the 2017 regular season with his best season yet, getting more receiving yards and touchdowns than his previous two seasons combined.

During Super Bowl LII against the New England Patriots, Agholor finished with nine receptions for 84 receiving yards as the Eagles won 41–33, earning their first Super Bowl championship in franchise history.

2018
On April 30, 2018, the Eagles exercised the fifth-year option on Agholor's contract in order to retain him for the 2019 season.

In the 2018 season opener, against the Atlanta Falcons, Agholor completed his first career NFL pass attempt to Nick Foles on a trick play that went for 15 yards. The play helped set up an eventual Jay Ajayi-rushing touchdown in the Eagles' 18–12 victory. In the next game, he scored his first receiving touchdown of the 2018 season as part of an eight-reception, 88-yard performance against the Tampa Bay Buccaneers. He put his best statistical performance of the season in the Week 16 32–30 victory over the Houston Texans with five receptions for 116 yards and a touchdown. Overall, in the 2018 season, he finished with 64 receptions for 736 yards and four touchdowns.

2019
In Week 2 against the Atlanta Falcons, Agholor caught eight passes for 107 yards and his first receiving touchdown of the season. However, with his team down late in the fourth quarter, he dropped a wide-open pass that could have led to the go-ahead score after losing it in the lights of Mercedes-Benz Stadium. The Eagles lost the game 24–20 as a result.
In Week 3 against the Detroit Lions, Agholor caught eight passes for 50 yards and two touchdowns as the Eagles lost 27–24. Overall, Agholor finished the 2019 season with 39 receptions for 363 receiving yards and three receiving touchdowns.

Las Vegas Raiders
On March 25, 2020, Agholor signed a one-year contract with the Las Vegas Raiders.

Agholor entered training camp competing for a starting wide receiver job against Tyrell Williams, Zay Jones, Hunter Renfrow, and rookies Henry Ruggs and Bryan Edwards.  At the end of training camp, head coach Jon Gruden named Agholor the fourth wide receiver on the Raiders’ depth chart, behind Ruggs, Edwards, and Renfrow.   

Agholor made his debut with the Raiders in Week 1 against the Carolina Panthers.  During the game, Agholor caught one pass for a 23 yard touchdown in the 34–30 win.
Following an injury to Edwards in Week 3, Agholor stepped into the starting lineup in Week 4 against the Buffalo Bills and caught 4 passes for 44 yards and a touchdown.  In Week 5 against the Kansas City Chiefs, Agholor caught two passes for 67 yards, including a 59-yard touchdown reception, as the Raiders won 40–32. In Week 7 against the Tampa Bay Buccaneers, he had five receptions for 107 receiving yards and a touchdown in the 45–20 loss. In Week 14, against the Indianapolis Colts, he had five receptions for 100 yards and a touchdown in the 44–27 loss. In Week 16 against the Miami Dolphins, Agholor recorded five catches for 155 yards, including an 85 yard touchdown reception, during the 26–25 loss.  Agholor finished the season with 48 receptions for 896 yards and eight touchdowns in 16 games (13 starts).

New England Patriots

2021 season
On March 19, 2021, Agholor signed a two-year, $26 million contract with the New England Patriots. In his Patriots debut, Agholor caught a touchdown from Mac Jones against the Miami Dolphins in Week 1. He finished the 2021 season with 37 receptions for 473 yards and three touchdowns in 15 games.

2022 season
In Week 2, against the Pittsburgh Steelers, Agholor had six receptions for 110 yards and a touchdown in the 17–14 victory. He finished the season sixth on the team with 31 catches for 362 yards and two touchdowns, his lowest mark since his rookie year.

NFL career statistics

Regular season

Playoffs

References

External links

 New England Patriots bio
 USC Trojans bio
 

1993 births
Living people
American football wide receivers
Las Vegas Raiders players
New England Patriots players
Nigerian emigrants to the United States
Nigerian players of American football
Philadelphia Eagles players
Players of American football from Tampa, Florida
USC Trojans football players